Mandakini Kamalakar Gogate (देवनागरी: मंदाकिनी कमलाकर गोगटे) (16 May 1936 – 15 January 2010) was a Marathi writer from Maharashtra, India.

She was born on May 16, 1936 in Mumbai, and received her bachelor's degree from SNDT Women's University. She also had a G. D. Art degree.

Literary works
The following is a list of Gogate's literary work:

Collections of short stories
 सवत माझी लाडकी (Sawat Majhi Ladaki) (1994)
 प्रेमाच्या होड्या (Premachya Hodya) (1995)
 स्वप्नातली परी (Swapnatali Pari)
 ढळता दिवस (Dhalata Diwas)
 गंध मातीचा (Gandha Maticha)
 मुंबईच्या रंगीबेरंगी मुली (Mumbaichya Rangi Berangi Muli)

Novels
 ह्या कातर उत्तररात्री (Hya Katar Uttar Ratri) (1996)
 गागी (Gagi)
 रसिक बलमा (Rasilk Balama)

Travelogues
 त्या फुलांच्या सुंदर प्रदेशात (Tya Phulanchya Sundar Pradeshat) (1995)
 आमचीपण सिंदबादची सफर (Amachi Pan Sindabadchi Saphar) (1995)
 जांबो जांबो ग्वाना (Jambo Jambo Gwana) (Tanzania safari)

Other works
 छानदार कथा भाग १ व २ (Chhandar Katha) (Children's literature)
 बोले तैशी चाले (Bole Taishi Chale) (One-act play)
 प्रेमा पुरव :  क्रांतिकारी अन्नपूर्णा (Prema Purav : Krantikari Annapurna) (Biography)
 महंमद घोरीची सांगली (Mahammad Ghorichi Sangali)  (Science fiction) (1996)
 चिमाजीअप्पाची मिशी (Chimaji Appachi Mishi) (Essays)
 सर्पांची अजब दुनिया (Sarpanchi Ajab Duniya) (Nature)

References

Gogate, Mandakini Kamalakar
2010 deaths
1936 births
SNDT Women's University alumni